Events in the year 2018 in Ghana.

Incumbents
President Nana Akufo-Addo 
Vice President: Mahamudu Bawumia 
 Chief Justice: Sophia Akuffo

Events

Undated
Gladys Amoah is appointed the Managing Director of Unilever Ghana.

Deaths

 18 August - Kofi Annan, seventh Secretary-General of the United Nations

 
2010s in Ghana
Years of the 21st century in Ghana
Ghana
Ghana